Kepler's may refer to:

Kepler's Books, bookstore in Menlo Park, California
Kepler's equation in orbital mechanics
Kepler's laws of planetary motion, describing the motion of planets around the Sun
Kepler's Supernova, supernova in the Milky Way

See also
Kepler (disambiguation)